Bissa (or Bisa (singular), Bisan, Bissanno (plural)), is a Mande ethnic group of south-central Burkina Faso, northeastern Ghana and the northernmost tip of Togo. Their language, Bissa, is a Mande language that is related to, but not the same as, a cluster of languages in the old Borgu Kingdom area of Northeast Benin and Northwest Nigeria, including Busa, Boko, and Kyenga. An alternate name for the Bissa is Busansi or Busanga which is used by the Mossi people.

Daniel McFarland's Historical Dictionary of Upper Volta refers to them as "intrusive Mande who settled the area along the White Volta below Tenkodogo by 1300. Some live across the border in modern northern Ghana and Togo. According to some traditions, Rialle, progenitor of the Nakomse line of Mossi rulers was Busansi."

They are known for their cultivation of peanuts. Traditionally, a Bissa man who wants to court a Bissa girl must work in her mother's peanut field, and be able to provide the girl with her own peanut field if they get married.

The Bissa are divided in three language groups, that is the Barka, the Lebir and the Lere.  They are further divided into several clans.  Each clan has a name and an appellation normally called dedaa by the Bissa. The appellation is now used as a surname in Burkina Faso.

Some Bissa live in Ivory Coast.

The Busa and Boko peoples of Benin and Nigeria
The Busa and Boko peoples, two subgroups of the Bissa people, live in Northwestern Nigeria and Northern Benin near Borgu in the Nigerian States of Niger, Kebbi and Kwara (mostly Bokobaru subgroup) and in the Beninese Departments of Alibori and Borgou.

They speak Busa (also known as Bisã) and Boko (also known as Boo). This peoples are referred to as Bussawa in Hausa.

Some notable clans and Appellations of the Bissa Tribe

The Bissa people are divided into numerous clans. Their language differs slightly; dialects are Barka, Lere, and Lebir.

Most Bissa are Muslim. The Bissa of the Garango Circle are among the most representative of the north. The Garango township, which forms the center of the northern Bissa, remained independent, while the northwestern districts were under the tutelage of the Mossi kingdom of Ouagadougou and the northeastern townships under the supervision of the Mossi kingdom of Tenkodogo. In Accra, Ghana, some of the established and notable towns are Busanga line in the North Kaneshie area of the Okai Koi constituency. Other towns noted for their Bissa people are Town Council line or Lartebiokorshie and shukura in the Ablekuma central constituency, and Nima in Ayawaso central constituency.
In Bissa's tribes, Lingani's are the holder of both the political power and the mystical power. The person that hold the power is not the one with the crown but the one that gives the crown. No one can access to the power and wear the crown prior being mystically prepared by the Lingani's in Tangaré village of Garango in the province of Boulgou (Burkina Faso). The Lingani's are hunters and the ceremonial fig tree with their ancestors centenary hunting spear is still visible today near Tangaré mountain facing Lingani's familial house. Bissas live with their dead ancestors buried in front of their houses in order to honor them. Bissa burial sites are  dug in shape of  traditional building but underground with a small hole for the body entrance and the person that receives the body to lay him for rest. Several people can be buried in the same familial grave. The grave entrance is covered with a clay vase that can be removed for future burial. Barso the ancestor of the Bissas was a hunter.
NOTE.
Is From Bissa Bissam Baa Kamaji house.

References

Further reading

 https://www.fichier-pdf.fr/2013/09/27/livre-d-apprentissage-de-langue-bissa-2/



Ethnic groups in Burkina Faso
Ethnic groups in Ghana
Ethnic groups in Togo
Mandé people